Luigi Lanfranchi (14 January 1914 – 17 June 1969) was an Italian field hockey player. He competed in the men's tournament at the 1952 Summer Olympics.

References

External links
 

1914 births
1969 deaths
Italian male field hockey players
Olympic field hockey players of Italy
Field hockey players at the 1952 Summer Olympics
Sportspeople from Genoa